The eighth Central American Championships in Athletics were held at the Estadio Nacional in San José, Costa Rica, between November 26–29, 1975. 

A total of 36 events were contested.

Medal summary
Some results and medal winners could be reconstructed from the archive of Costa Rican newspaper La Nación.

Men

Women

Medal table
A medal table was published.

Team Rankings
Costa Rica won the overall team ranking, the team ranking in the men's
category and in the women's category

Total

Male

Female

References

 
International athletics competitions hosted by Costa Rica
Central American Championships in Athletics
Central American Championships in Athletics
Sport in San José, Costa Rica
Central American Championships in Athletics
20th century in San José, Costa Rica